The men's road race at the 1978 UCI Road World Championships was the 45th edition of the event. The race took place on Sunday 27 August 1978 in Adenau, West Germany. The race was won by Gerrie Knetemann of the Netherlands.

Final classification

References

Men's Road Race
UCI Road World Championships – Men's road race
1978 Super Prestige Pernod